Zhu Xudan (born 15 April 1992), also known as Bambi Zhu, is a Chinese actress. She is known for her supporting role in Eternal Love and her lead role as Zhou Zhiruo in Heavenly Sword and Dragon Slaying Sabre.

Early life and education
Zhu Xudan was born 15 April 1992 in Qiqihar, Heilongjiang. Since the young age of 6, she started learning dance. Prior to debuting, she worked as an advertisement model. In 2010, Zhu was enrolled in the Central Academy of Drama majoring in performance arts. In 2012, she participated in the variety program Crazy For School Beauty, and was then signed on to Le.com as an artist for seven months.

Career

2013–2015: Acting debut
In 2013, Zhu made her first appearance in the CCTV legal program Wo Di Qian Chuan: Jie Mei. The same year, she appeared in the sitcom Wonder Lady, and also starred in the music short film Long Tan Dream. Zhu then appeared in a series of short web films.

In 2015, Zhu received her first major role in the web series The Ferryman 2; and also appeared in the historical war drama The Legend of Yongle Emperor, and period mystery drama A Detective Housewife.

2017–present: Rising popularity
In 2017, Zhu played the antagonist in the fantasy romance drama  Eternal Love. The series was a major hit and led to increased popularity for Zhu. The same year, she played her first leading role in the romantic campus web series Hi Flower; and also starred in the fantasy wuxia drama The Soul Stitcher.

In 2018, Zhu played supporting roles in the workplace drama Negotiator and romantic comedy drama Sweet Dreams. Both dramas attained high ratings when it aired on Hunan Television and led to increased recognition for Zhu.

In 2019, Zhu starred as one of the two female leads, Zhou Zhiruo in the wuxia drama Heavenly Sword and Dragon Slaying Sabre based on the novel of the same name by Jin Yong. Zhu received increased recognition after the drama aired.

Zhu is also set to star in the period romance drama Love in a Fallen City alongside Ethan Juan, and crime suspense drama Haunted Houses Handbook alongside Hou Minghao.

Filmography

Television series

Short film

Variety show

Awards and nominations

References

External links 
 

1992 births
Living people
People from Qiqihar
Actresses from Heilongjiang
Central Academy of Drama alumni
Chinese television actresses
21st-century Chinese actresses
Jay Walk Studio